"Eldorado" is a poem written by Edgar Allan Poe, first published in April 1849.

Summary 
The poem describes the journey of a "gallant knight" in search of the legendary El Dorado. The knight spends much of his life on this quest. In his old age, he finally meets a "pilgrim shadow" who points the way through "the Valley of Shadow". It was first published in the April 21, 1849, issue of the Boston-based The Flag of Our Union.

Analysis 
The poem is a narrative made up of four six-line stanzas, known as sestets. Poe uses the term shadow in the middle of each stanza. The meaning of the word, however, changes with each use. First, it is a literal shadow, where the sun is blocked out. In the second, it implies gloom or despair. The third denotes a ghost. The final use, "the Valley of Shadow", references the  "Valley of the Shadow of Death", possibly suggesting that Eldorado (or riches in general) does not exist in the living world, or may be extremely difficult to find in the physical realm. Eldorado can also be interpreted not as the worldly, yellowish metal, but as treasures that actually have the possibility of existence in the abode of spirits. These "spiritual" treasures are that of the mind: knowledge, understanding, and wisdom.

The time of the poem's publication, 1849, was during the California Gold Rush and the poem is, in part, Poe's reaction to that event.

"Eldorado" was one of Poe's last poems. As Poe scholar Scott Peeples wrote, the poem is "a fitting close to a discussion of Poe's career." Like the subject of the poem, Poe was on a quest for success or happiness and, despite spending his life searching for it, he eventually loses his strength and faces death.

Adaptation 
"Eldorado" was set to music by several 19th-century composers, including the Americans Charles Sanford Skilton, Edgar Stillman Kelley, and the British composer Richard Henry Walthew, and for the London choir by Joseph Harold Hinton. In 1993 Eldorado, along with Hymn and Evening Star, was adapted by Jonathan Adams (composer) as Three Songs from Edgar Allan Poe for SATB chorus and piano. The better-known composer John Adams also composed an Eldorado symphony.

In popular music, the poem was used in 1996 for the lyrics of a Donovan song on his album Sutras. In 2000 "Eldorado" was adapted as song by the Darkwave band Sopor Aeternus & the Ensemble of Shadows on the album Songs from the inverted Womb and again in 2013 on the album Poetica (All Beauty Sleeps).

In 2017, Mad Duck recorded a version of "Eldorado" in the album Braggart stories and dark poems.

In the 1966 John Wayne film El Dorado, James Caan recites parts of the poems at different times. Caan's character Mississippi recites all but the second stanza of the poem during the film. The character learned the poem from a mentor, Johnny Diamond, whose death he avenged. In the 1990 movie Young Guns 2, Kiefer Sutherland's character, Josiah "Doc" Scurlock was heard reciting the last stanza for a prostitute and claiming to have written the poem himself. In 2012 the poem was recited and is a central part of the plot of the horror-comedy film Eldorado.

References

External links
 
"Eldorado" by Edgar A. Poe, The Flag of Our Union, April 21, 1849. Library of Congress.

1849 poems
California Gold Rush in fiction
Poetry by Edgar Allan Poe
Works originally published in The Flag of Our Union